The Battle of Łomianki was a part of the opening campaign of World War II during the 1939 German invasion of Poland, fought  between Polish and German forces. It was a failed counter-offensive attempt by the Polish forces.

Background

After the defeat of two Polish Armies in the Battle of Bzura, except for a few units, all Polish divisions and brigades were cut off in the Western Poland. They had no choice, but to withdraw to Modlin Fortress or Warsaw. A couple divisions and brigades did successfully reach Warsaw, but majority was halted by the Germans who were about to close the ring around the Polish capital. Around 5,000 Polish soldiers and officers led by General Mikołaj Bołtuć decided to fight by Łomianki.

Battle

The Poles were opposed by 3 German infantry divisions who dug in. In spite of the low odds of success, a combined assault of the Polish infantry, cavalry, and police did find a weak spot and penetrated the 1st line of the German defenses. However, afterward, the Poles made no progress.

Aftermath

800 Poles ended up dead. Moreover, 4,000 were seriously wounded. Only about 200 men survived the battle suffering only minor injuries. General Mikołaj Bołtuć, the commanding officer was killed by sniper fire while leading the charge.
The German losses are unknown.

See also 

 List of World War II military equipment of Poland
 List of German military equipment of World War II

References 

Battles of the Invasion of Poland
World War II sites in Poland
World War II sites of Nazi Germany
Warsaw Voivodeship (1919–1939)